Milan Nedić (2 September 1878 – 4 February 1946) was a Yugoslav and Serbian army general and politician who served as the chief of the General Staff of the Royal Yugoslav Army and minister of war in the Royal Yugoslav Government. During World War II, he collaborated with Nazi Germany and served as the prime minister of the puppet government of National Salvation, in the German occupied territory of Serbia. After the war, the Yugoslav communist authorities imprisoned him. In 1946, it was reported that he had committed suicide. He was included in the 100 most prominent Serbs list. There have been attempts since the 2000s to present Nedić's role in World War II more positively. All applications to rehabilitate him have so far been refused by the official Serbian courts.

Early life
Milan Nedić was born in the Belgrade suburb of Grocka on 2 September 1878 to Đorđe and Pelagia Nedić. His father was a local district chief and his mother was a teacher from a village near Mount Kosmaj. She was the granddaughter of Nikola Mihailović, who was mentioned in the writings of poet Sima Milutinović Sarajlija and was an ally of Serbian revolutionary leader Karađorđe. The Nedić family was originally from the village of Zaoka, near Lazarevac. It traced its origins to two brothers, Damjan and Gligorije, who defended the Čokešina Monastery from the Turks during the Serbian Revolution. The family received its name from Nedić's great-grandmother, Neda, who was a member of the Vasojevići tribe from modern-day Montenegro.

Military and political career
Nedić finished gymnasium in Kragujevac in 1895 and entered the lower level of the Military Academy in Belgrade that year. In 1904, he completed the upper level of the academy, then the General Staff preparatory, and was commissioned into the Serbian Army. In 1910, he was promoted to the rank of major. He fought with the Serbian Army during the Balkan Wars, and received multiple decorations for bravery. In 1913, he was promoted to the rank of lieutenant colonel. He served with the Serbian Army during World War I and was involved in rearguard actions during its retreat through Albania in the winter of 1915. That year, he was promoted to the rank of colonel. At 38, he was the youngest colonel in the Serbian General Staff. He was appointed ordnance officer to King Peter in 1916. Towards the end of the war, Nedić was given command of an infantry brigade of the Timok Division.

Nedić remained a brigade commander within the Timok Division until the end of 1918 and served as the 3rd Army chief of staff. Beginning in 1919, he also served as the de facto head of the 4th Army District in Croatia because its nominal commander, General Božidar Janković, was old and infirm. Nedić's cousin, Dimitrije Ljotić, and their mutual friend Stanislav Krakov, also served in the 4th Army District and were commanded by Nedić. When the Royal Yugoslav Army (VKJ) was formed in 1919 he was absorbed into the army at the same rank. He was promoted to Divizijski đeneral in 1923, and subsequently commanded a division then was Secretary-General of the Committee of National Defence. In 1930, Nedić was promoted to the rank of Armijski đeneral, and assumed command of the 3rd Army in Skoplje. Nedić was appointed Chief of the General Staff in June 1934, and held this position until the following year, when he became the third member of the Military Council, probably because of his strained relations with the Minister for the Army and Navy, Petar Živković. At the time, British diplomatic staff observed that he was "somewhat slow-thinking and obstinate". On 13 August 1939, Nedić was appointed Minister of the Army and Navy as part of the Cvetković–Maček Agreement. Ljotić later assisted the SS-Reichssicherheitshauptamt (Reich Security Central Office, RSHA) in establishing contacts with him. He also exploited the connections he had with Nedić to ensure that the banned Zbor-published journal Bilten (Bulletin) was distributed to members of the VKJ. The journal was published illegally in a military printing house and distributed throughout Yugoslavia by military couriers.

Because of his disapproval of a potential participation in the war against Adolf Hitler's Germany, Nedić was dismissed on 6 November 1940 by Prince Paul. This was most likely out of unease with Nazi Germany's ally, Fascist Italy which at the time harboured the Croatian extreme nationalist Ustashe leader Ante Pavelić in exile in Rome, and because of the rhetoric of some Italian fascists in the past such as the late Gabriele D'Annunzio, who were violently opposed to a Yugoslav state. Nedić welcomed the coup d'état of March 1941 which deposed the regime that had signed the Tripartite Pact, and commanded the 3rd Army Group in the German-led Axis invasion that followed.

German-occupied territory of Serbia

Wehrmacht commander Heinrich Danckelmann decided to entrust Nedić with the administration of German-occupied territory of Serbia in order to pacify Serb resistance. Not long before, Nedić had lost his only son and pregnant daughter in law in a munitions explosion in Smederevo, in which several thousands died. He accepted the post of the prime minister in the government called the Government of National Salvation, on 29 August 1941. At the same time mass imprisonment of the Jews started where police and gendarmerie of quisling government under Nedić assisted the Germans in arresting the Jews. 

On 1 September 1941 Nedić made a speech on Radio Belgrade in which he declared the intent of his administration to "save the core of the Serbian people" by accepting the occupation of Germany in the area of Šumadija, Drina Valley, Pomoravlje and Banat. He also spoke against organizing resistance to the occupying forces. His state's propaganda was funded by Germany and promoted anti-Semitism and anti-communism, particularly linking these up with anti-masonry. In his speeches he uses terms such as "Communist-Jewish rabble" and "Communist-Masonic-Jewish-English mafia". According to historian Milivoj Bešlin, terms from the categorical apparatus of Nazism  "white race", "pure race", "aryanism", etc, was used by Nedić's propaganda, while he strongly advocated protection of the Serbian people from "irregular mixtures". Also in that context, Nedić's government brought regulations for implementing the policy of the occupation authorities about losing the rights to work of Romani and Jewish population.   In March 1942, Nedić established the Serbian State Guard (Srpska državna straža) who together with the Gestapo participated in the guarding of the Banjica concentration camp, and were responsible for the killings of inmates, including children. In October 1943, the State Guard came under control of the SS. Its members were also engaged in the execution of captured Partisans.

The puppet government under Nedić accepted many refugees mostly of Serbian descent. The civil war unleashed in the German-occupied territory of Serbia was the cause of the loss of as many or even more lives than German terror. In total, between 141,000 and 167,000 people died in Serbia of war-related causes. These deaths included 34,000 killed by the Germans and their Serb helpers, 46,000 deaths in prisons and camps, and 33,000 Chetnik and 42,000 Partisan combatants. At least 300,000 people were deported from Serbia or held in prisons and concentration camps. German reprisals demanded that 100 Serbs be killed for each killed German soldier and 50 for each wounded German soldier, as in the Kragujevac massacre. Nedić implemented Hitler's anti Semitic policies and Belgrade became the first city in Europe to be declared Judenfrei ("clean of Jews") while Serbia itself was declared as such in August 1942. Nedić also secretly diverted money and arms from his government to the Chetniks. The military forces of Ljotić and Nedić together with the Wehrmacht participated in anti-Communist operations. In the 1942 Christmas address, he announced that "the old world, which had destroyed our state, is over and replaced by the new one. This new world will elevate Serbia to its rightful and honorable place in the new Europe; under the new leadership (of Germany) we look courageously into the future". In 1942 he outlined a memo of his vision of Great Serbia in which Bosnia-Herzegovina, Srijem, and Dalmatia are within Serbia's borders with local population replaced by Serbian settlers. On 28 February 1943, the commanding general in Serbia reduced the reprisal orders to 50 hostages for each German soldier, armed forces employee, civilian or Bulgarian soldier killed, and 25 for each German or Bulgarian wounded. Nedić was received by Adolf Hitler in September 1943 when they talked about security and order in the occupied territory, also at that meeting Nedić requested the annexation of East Bosnia, Montenegro, the Sanjak, Kosovo-Metohija and Srem. Joachim von Ribbentrop opposed Nedić’s demands which forced Hitler to appease Nedić by promising him concessions elsewhere.  Nedić's Ministry of Education, Ljotić and the intellectuals from the Zbor prepared Serbia and its youth by changing the education system in order to prepare the society for Hitler’s New Europe, in which anti-Semitism and anti-Communism were integral parts of the new ideological framework. About the "great" Adolf Hitler hundreds of texts was written by Nedic's propaganda.  

On 4 October 1944, with the successes of the Red Army, Bulgarian Army and Yugoslav Partisans and their combined onslaught on Belgrade, Nedić's puppet government was disbanded, and on 6 October Nedić fled from Belgrade to Kitzbühel, Austria (then annexed to Germany) where he took refuge with the occupying British. On 1 January 1946, the British forces handed him over to the Partisans.

He was incarcerated in Belgrade on charges of treason. On 4 February 1946, it is believed that Nedić either jumped out of the window of the Belgrade hospital where he was being detained or that he was pushed out to his death. According to official records, he committed suicide by jumping through the window. According to the Register of Victims Killed after 12 September 1944, Nedić was "liquidated".

Recently, Miodrag Mladenović, a former officer with the Yugoslavian OZNA, said that on 4 February 1946, he received an order to pick up a dead body at Zmaj Jovina street, where the prison was located at the time. When he arrived there, the body was already wrapped in a blanket and rigor mortis had already set in. Following the orders given to him, he took the body to the cemetery where it was buried in an unusually deep grave. He never attempted to see the face of the person that he was carrying, but the day after, he read in the news that Nedić had committed suicide by jumping through the prison window at Zmaj Jovina street.

Legacy
During the Miloševic era, the regime and some Serb historians found it extremely important to win over eminent Yugoslav Jewish organizations and individuals for the idea of the joint Serbo-Jewish martyrdom. To accomplish it, regime historians had to falsify history by obscuring the fact that Milan Nedic and Dimitrije Ljotić had cleansed Serbia of its sizeable Jewish population by deportations of Jews to East European concentration camps or killing them in Serbia.

The 1993 book The 100 most prominent Serbs  published by the Serbian Academy of Sciences and Arts included an entry on Nedić in which its editor, the art historian and its editor Dejan Medaković, claimed that Nedić was "one of the most tragic figures in Serbian history" whose collaboration saved "a million Serbian lives". Patriarch Pavle held a memorial service for Nedić in 1994, during which he justified his collaboration with Nazi Germany on the grounds that it was "the only way to save the Serbian people from the revenge of the occupiers".

After 2000, revisionists' demands for the rehabilitation of Milan Nedić began. The minor Serbian Liberal Party attempted to promote his rehabilitation as an anti-Nazi, who did his best in an impossible situation, sparking controversy in Serbia. The publisher of a 2002 secondary school history textbook, Nebojša Jovanović, told the daily Politika that collaboration with the Nazis was a way of preserving the ‘biological substance of the Serbian people".

Nedić's portrait was included among those of Serbian prime ministers in the building of the Government of Serbia. In 2008, the Minister of Interior and Deputy PM Ivica Dačić removed the portrait after neo-Nazi marches were announced in the country. Revisionist interpretations required that Nedić's collaboration with the occupying forces and responsibility for the execution of Jews under his rule be obscured, in order to remember him as the "savior of the Serbian people".

On 11 July 2018, The Higher Serbian Court in Belgrade rejected an application to rehabilitate the quisling Prime Minister of occupied Serbia during World War II, Milan Nedić. During the rehabilitation trial, historian Bojan Dimitrijevic from the Institute for Contemporary Serbian History claimed, based on archived documents, that Nedić was not directly involved in the persecution and killing of Jews. According to Dimitrijevic, Nedić's administration only registered Jews and gave them fake Serbian documents while the Germans rounded them up and performed all the executions.

Other sources claim that it was Nedić's role to protect Serbs from further executions in NDH and by Germans in Serbia by aiding in the persecution of Jews. Among other things, his regime confiscated and sold the property of Jews after they were executed by Germans, who were not interested in buying the homes and lands of Jews in Serbia.

According to historian and President of the Jewish community in Belgrade, Jaša Almuli, one of the major reasons behind the killing of 11,000 Jews in Serbia by Germans was through reprisals for resistance against Germans in occupied Serbia and that Jews were killed for the same reasons as Serbs: to fulfill Hitler's quota towards Serbs and Serbia: for a wounded soldier to kill 50 and for a dead German soldier to kill 100 people. For that reason, together with Serbs and Gypsies, about 5,000 Jews were shot. German SS General Harald Turner was the main culprit behind the shooting of Jews in occupied Serbia.

According to Philip J. Cohen, in Nedić's Serbia about 15,000 Jews perished or 94% of Serbian Jews. According to Jelena Subotić, 27,000 Jews out of 33,500 in pre-occupied Serbia were killed in the Holocaust, and another 1,000 from central Europe, mostly from Czechoslovakia and Austria. Of the approximately 17,000 Jews who resided in German-occupied Serbia, 82% of them were killed early on, including 11,000 Belgrade Jews.

During the COVID-19 pandemics in 2020, school classes were presented on the Radio Television of Serbia. One lecture for eighth grade students caught attention of the Serbian public. The teacher spoke positively about Milan Nedić and his role in WWII, even though such opinions are not based on the official textbook for the 8th grade. Dubravka Stojanović commented on this lecture and emphasized that the games played with fascism and anti-fascism when it comes to "basic good and evil" brought the society into complete disorientation. She also pointed out that she often warned about the problems of revisionist history and rehabilitation of collaborators from WWII in history textbooks.

Works
Srpska vojska i solunska ofanziva, 1932
Kralj Aleksandar Prvi Ujedinitelj: kao vojskovođ, 1935
Srpska vojska na Albanskoj Golgoti, 1937

Citations

Notes

Footnotes

References

External links

 

1878 births
1946 suicides
Eastern Orthodox Christians from Serbia
Government ministers of Yugoslavia
Members of the Serbian Orthodox Church
People from the Principality of Serbia
People who committed suicide in prison custody
Politicians from Belgrade
Christian fascists
Romani genocide perpetrators
Holocaust perpetrators in Yugoslavia
Prisoners who died in Yugoslav detention
Eastern Orthodoxy and far-right politics
Royal Serbian Army soldiers
Royal Yugoslav Army personnel of World War II
Serbia under German occupation
Serbian anti-communists
Serbian collaborators with Nazi Germany
Serbian generals
Serbian military personnel of the Balkan Wars
Serbian military personnel of World War I
Serbian people of World War II
Serbian people who died in prison custody
Serbian politicians who committed suicide
Serbian fascists
Suicides by jumping in Serbia
Suicides in Yugoslavia
World War II political leaders
Army general (Kingdom of Yugoslavia)
Yugoslav fascists